The Mid-Atlantic Collegiate Hockey Association (MACH) is a college ice hockey league based in the Southeastern region of the United States. The conference is part of the American Collegiate Hockey Association Division 2 and is made up of five teams from colleges and universities based in Delaware, Maryland, New Jersey and Pennsylvania.

Format
Each team plays every team in their division twice throughout the season. Only divisional games are counted towards standings. All five teams, regardless of point total, are eligible to qualify for league playoffs. The 4th and 5th seeds play in a wildcard match, to see who advances to the playoffs. The two winners of the semifinal games meet to determine the league championship.  League and non-conference games are taken into consideration to qualify for the ACHA Division II Regional & National Tournaments.

Member Clubs
Of the five member schools, four compete at the Division I level of NCAA and one at Division III. Stevenson University joined the conference in 2017 following the launch of its own club men's ice hockey program.

Note: Stevenson has an NCAA Division III hockey team competing in the UCHC

Conference arenas

Former members
Army moved to the SECHL in 2018
Monmouth University moved to the CSCHC
St. Joseph's University moved to the ACCHL
Temple University moved to ACHA Division I
UMBC folded their program in 2017, rebirthed in 2019 in DVCHC of the CHF
Virginia Tech moved to the ACCHL
Wagner College folded their program in 2018
Millersville University Currently in the CSCHC
Montclair State University moved to the SECHL
The College of New Jersey Joined GNCHC, then moved to the CSCHC in 2014; now ACHA Division I
Princeton University Joined GNCHC, then moved to the CSCHC in 2014; now in the ACCHL
University of Pennsylvania Joined GNCHC, then moved to the CSCHC in 2014
William Paterson University moved to the SECHL; now in ACHA Division I
Seton Hall University Joined GNCHC, then moved to the CSCHC in 2014
Lafayette College Joined GNCHC, then moved to the DVCHC of the CHF
East Carolina University Currently in the ACCHL
Kennesaw State University Currently in College Hockey South of the CHF
Penn State Currently in the ACCHL
Rowan University Currently in the ACCHL
Liberty University Currently ACHA Division II Independent

Past Champions

See also
Collegiate Hockey Federation https://www.chfhockey.net/
American Collegiate Hockey Association
List of ice hockey leagues

References 

ACHA Division 2 conferences
Ice hockey in Delaware
Ice hockey in Maryland
Ice hockey in New Jersey
Ice hockey in Pennsylvania
1997 establishments in the United States